The Sugar Pine Point Light was a small lighthouse located on Lake Tahoe, in El Dorado County, California, in the United States. The tower no longer stands, but a small post light marks the site. It is located within the bounds of Ed Z'berg Sugar Pine Point State Park.

History
In 1921, various commercial interests lobbied for the replacement of the Rubicon Point Light with a light on Sugar Pine Point. It was suggested that the light be housed in a small frame tower similar to the one at Rubicon Point, and that the characteristic light not be changed.

The light was apparently built, but was discontinued in 1935. It was relit the following year at a cost of $590.52.

See also

 List of lighthouses in the United States

References

External links
 Brief Sugar Pine Point Light history
 Picture of Sugar Pine Point Light

Lighthouses in California
Lake Tahoe
History of El Dorado County, California
Transportation buildings and structures in El Dorado County, California
Lighthouses completed in 1921